Neon Static is the eighth studio album by La Mafia released on June 29, 1985. It peaked on the Billboard Regional Mexican chart at number fourteen.

Track listing

References

1985 albums
La Mafia albums
Spanish-language albums